Tom Christopher Brittney (born 26 October 1990) is an English actor who is best known for playing the Reverend Will Davenport in Grantchester (2019–present).

Biography 
Tom Brittney was born in Gravesend, Kent on 26 October 1990. He moved to Devon when he was 12, where his mother taught drama. 
Brittney trained at the Royal Central School of Speech and Drama in London.

His mother is the author Lynn Brittney. He has a younger sister, Rose, who is a trained dancer.

Career 
Brittney's first TV appearance was in the daytime soap opera Doctors in 2013. The following year, he joined the recurring cast of historical/fantasy series Outlander, in which he played Lieutenant Jeremy Foster, one of Black Jack Randall's men. He also appeared briefly in an episode of the BBC TV series Call the Midwife, and a short film called The Unknowns. In 2015, he was cast as DS Ken Howells in the crime drama The Five, written by U.S. crime author Harlan Coben. He also appeared as a recurring character in the third season of  The Syndicate, playing Tyler Mitchell, and played Roger Lockwood in the TV series UnReal. In the same year, he played Greg in Humans. He appeared in Film Stars Don't Die in Liverpool as Tim.

In 2017, he appeared as David in X Company, and played Conrad Habicht in an episode of Genius. In June 2018, Brittney joined the cast of the ITV crime drama Grantchester as the Reverend Will Davenport, the new lead character. Brittney starred as Billy in the drama Make Me Famous in 2020. Written by Reggie Yates and directed by Peter King, the film explores the impact and consequences of fast fame on reality TV participants and their close friends and families.

Personal life
Brittney lives in London. One of his hobbies is photography.

On acting, Brittney revealed that he had always wanted to be an actor: "having that ambition makes it all the more painful when it doesn't come to reality. I didn't have a plan B [...] luckily, I'd like to think it's working out, but it's a tough journey, I think putting all your love and hope into your ambition."

Brittney was diagnosed with body dysmorphia. In 2020, he revealed: "I used to take off days from school, because I just hated the way that I looked [...] I'm very insecure with the way that I look and I'll beat myself up about performances."

Filmography

Television

Film

References

External links
 
Tom Brittney on Twitter

English television actors
1990 births
Living people
People from Gravesend, Kent
Alumni of the Royal Central School of Speech and Drama